Eichmann is a biographical film detailing the interrogation of Adolf Eichmann. Directed by Robert Young, the film stars Thomas Kretschmann as Eichmann and Troy Garity as Eichmann's Israeli interrogator, Avner Less. It was first released in Brazil in September 2007, and was released in the United States in October 2010.

Plot
The film is based on manuscripts of the interrogations of Adolf Eichmann (Thomas Kretschmann) before he was tried and hanged in a prison in Israel. Eichmann recounts events from his past to an Israeli detective, Chief inspector Avner Less (Troy Garity), who is faced with the immense task of tricking the skilled manipulator into self-incrimination. While the world waits, Less's countrymen call for immediate execution, forcing him and Eichmann to confront each other in a battle of wills.

Cast
 Thomas Kretschmann as Adolf Eichmann
 Troy Garity as Chief inspector Avner Less
 Franka Potente as Vera Less
 Stephen Fry as Minister Tormer
 Delaine Yates as Miriam Fröhlich
 Tereza Srbova as Baroness Ingrid von Ihama
 Judit Viktor as Ann Marie
 Stephen Greif as Hans Lipmann

See also
 Eichmann in Jerusalem
 Eichmann Interrogated

References

External links
 
 

2007 films
British biographical films
World War II war crimes trials films
Films set in Jerusalem
Films set in the 1960s
Films about the capture of Adolf Eichmann
British drama films
Cultural depictions of Adolf Eichmann
Films scored by Richard Harvey
2000s English-language films
2000s British films